Cristian Popovici (born 13 February 1968) is a Romanian former professional footballer and currently a manager. As a footballer Popovici played nine years for FCM Bacău, being an important member of the team that beat Steaua București with 5-1 right on the Steaua Stadium and also had appearances in European competitions as UEFA Cup or UEFA Intertoto Cup. After retirement, Popovici started his football manager career, being well known for coaching especially teams from Bacău and Moldavia such as: Aerostar Bacău, FCM Bacău, SC Bacau, FC Botoșani or Foresta Suceava, the only interruptions consisting of two short spells at Dinamo II București and Metaloglobus București.

Honours

Player
 FCM Bacău
 Divizia B: Winner 1994–95

Manager
 FC Botoșani
 Liga II: Winner 2012–13

 Aerostar Bacău
 Liga III: Winner 2017–18

References

External links
 
 

Living people
1968 births
Sportspeople from Bacău
Romanian footballers
Association football defenders
Liga I players
Liga II players
FCM Bacău players
Romanian football managers
CS Aerostar Bacău managers
FCM Bacău managers
FC Botoșani managers
ACS Foresta Suceava managers
FC Metaloglobus București managers
CS Știința Miroslava managers